

Fritz Wentzell (29 April 1899 – 1 April 1948) was a German general (Generalleutnant) in the Wehrmacht during World War II. He was a recipient of the Knight's Cross of the Iron Cross of Nazi Germany.

Awards and decorations

 Knight's Cross of the Iron Cross on 23 October 1944 as Generalmajor and chief of the general staff of the 10. Armee

References

Citations

Bibliography

 
 

1899 births
1948 deaths
Military personnel from Kassel
Lieutenant generals of the German Army (Wehrmacht)
German Army personnel of World War I
Recipients of the Gold German Cross
Recipients of the Knight's Cross of the Iron Cross
Prussian Army personnel
German prisoners of war in World War II
German Army generals of World War II